There are two municipalities called Sainte-Félicité in Quebec:
Sainte-Félicité, Bas-Saint-Laurent, Quebec, in La Matanie Regional County Municipality
Sainte-Félicité, Chaudière-Appalaches, Quebec, in L'Islet Regional County Municipality